Baron Amulree, of Strathbraan in the County of Perth, was a title in the Peerage of the United Kingdom. It was created on 22 July 1929 for the lawyer and Labour politician Sir William Mackenzie. He was Secretary of State for Air between 1930 and 1931. He was succeeded by his son, a physician. The second Lord Amulree was unmarried and the title became extinct on his death on 15 December 1983.

Barons Amulree (1929)
William Warrender Mackenzie, 1st Baron Amulree (1860–1942)
Basil William Sholto Mackenzie, 2nd Baron Amulree (1900–1983)

References

Extinct baronies in the Peerage of the United Kingdom
Noble titles created in 1929